Matthias Lexer (18 October 1830 – 16 April 1892), later Matthias von Lexer (from 1885), was a German lexicographer, author of the principal dictionary of the Middle High German language, Mittelhochdeutsches Handwörterbuch von Matthias Lexer, completed in 1878 in three volumes. This dictionary was founded upon the base of the Mittelhochdeutsches Wörterbuch by Benecke, Müller and Zarncke, completed in 1866 in three volumes.

Matthias Lexer received a PhD in a lexicological subject at age 30 in 1860 at the University of Erlangen, where one of his teachers was the historian Karl von Hegel. From then onward he held teaching positions at German universities.

"The Middle High German dictionary [of Matthias Lexer] is noted for its admirably comprehensive coverage of the language of courtly literature.... [It has some] gaps in its medical and scientific vocabulary, and the coverage of legal terminology."

Footnotes

External links
 
Matthias Lexer's Middle High German dictionary online (searchable by headword) at Woerterbuchnetz.de.

German lexicographers
German philologists
1830 births
1892 deaths
19th-century lexicographers